is a Japanese–Australian voice actress and idol. She debuted in 2016, acted as Warspite, a game character from Kantai Collection.

Personal life 
Shu Uchida was born in Japan and lived in Sydney, New South Wales from the age of two to 18. At that time, she watched Bleach, Naruto, and so on. She was impressed by Romi Park, the voice actor of Tōshirō Hitsugaya, and wanted to be a voice actress. Inspired by Tetsuya Kakihara, she skipped university to pursue her dream as a voice actress and moved back to Japan alone in 2014.

On September 30, 2020, she left LINK PLAN with Mayu Sagara, her friend at the same agency. The next day, October 1, she announced to be affiliated with a new artist management department "CaliCom" from StrayCats.

She likes reading, cooking, making sweets, and collecting makeup. She is proficient in English and got a 990 full score upon her first attempt on TOEIC. As she has some American English speaking characters, which is different to her native Australian English, she studied hard on the English pronunciation.

On February 1, 2021, she started her YouTube channel "ShuTube". The content of the channel is mainly about the culture in Japan and Australia.

On October 1, 2022, CaliCom contract period was expired on September 30 and then she transferred to Just Pro.

Her motto is "Open the door, it may lead you to someplace never expected."

Works

Television animation

Film animation

Game

Drama CD 
 YomeKura (2017, Leia August)
 Maid in dream ~Princess and Maid's sweet life~ (2021, シーナ・プブレリウム)

Digital comic 
  (2019, Miharu Aifune)
  Series 4 (2021, Mia Taylor)

Radio 
 Lumina Charis's Lumi curriculum!（2017–2020, ）
 Radio "The Expression Amrilato" ~Yuri Yuri Juliamo~（2017, ※）

Web shows 
 Shu Uchida's It's Shu Time (2019–2020, Niconico Live, YouTube)
 Let's have a talk in Shu Uchida's Café?（2021 - , Niconico Live）

TV 
  (2019 - 2021) - Assistant

Narration 
 Megalith IT Alliance (December, 2016– )
 C3 AFA Singapore 2018
  (April 21, 2019)

Podcast 
 Trash Taste Season 2 #58
 ProZD + Pals Episode 52

Other 
 Boku Otter (designer)
 English Learning App "Rei's English Words" (2021-, English Part)

References

External links 
 Shu Uchida Official site
 Official Profile (Just Pro)
 
 
 

1996 births
Living people
Actresses from Sydney
Australian people of Japanese descent
Australian YouTubers
English-language YouTube channels
Japanese video game actresses
Japanese voice actresses
Nijigasaki High School Idol Club members